The Port Joli River (in French: rivière Port Joli) is a tributary of the south shore of the St. Lawrence River where it flows southwest of the village of Saint-Jean-Port-Joli and north-east of the village of L'Islet-sur-Mer.

The Port Joli river flows through the municipalities of Saint-Damase-de-L'Islet, Sainte-Louise and Saint-Jean-Port-Joli, in the L'Islet Regional County Municipality, in the administrative region of Chaudière-Appalaches, in Quebec, in Canada.

Geography 
The Port Joli river takes its source from agricultural streams, located in the municipality of Saint-Damase-de-L'Islet. Trois Saumons Lake flows through its northeast end.

  south-west in Saint-Damase-de-L'Islet, to the Sainte-Louise limit;
  west in Sainte-Louise, to the limit of Saint-Jean-Port-Joli;
  southwest, to route 204;
  southwest, to highway 20;
  to the southwest, to its confluence.

At the end of its course, the Trois Saumons river flows onto the long shore (at low tide) in Anse Port Joli, on the south shore of the middle St. Lawrence estuary.

Toponymy 
The toponym Rivière Port Joli was formalized on December 2, 1975, at the Commission de toponymie du Québec.

See also

 List of rivers of Quebec

References 

Rivers of Chaudière-Appalaches
L'Islet Regional County Municipality